Horse Linto Creek is a stream in Humboldt County, California, in the United States.

Horse Linto was the phonetic pronunciation of the Native American settlement formerly at the creek.

See also
List of rivers of California

References

Rivers of Humboldt County, California
Rivers of Northern California